Elections to Omagh District Council were held on 18 May 1977 on the same day as the other Northern Irish local government elections. The election used four district electoral areas to elect a total of 20 councillors.

Election results

Note: "Votes" are the first preference votes.

Districts summary

|- class="unsortable" align="centre"
!rowspan=2 align="left"|Ward
! % 
!Cllrs
! % 
!Cllrs
! %
!Cllrs
! %
!Cllrs
! % 
!Cllrs
!rowspan=2|TotalCllrs
|- class="unsortable" align="center"
!colspan=2 bgcolor="" | UUP
!colspan=2 bgcolor="" | SDLP
!colspan=2 bgcolor="" | Alliance
!colspan=2 bgcolor="" | RC
!colspan=2 bgcolor="white"| Others
|-
|align="left"|Area A
|bgcolor="40BFF5"|39.8
|bgcolor="40BFF5"|2
|33.1
|1
|9.5
|1
|0.0
|0
|17.6
|1
|5
|-
|align="left"|Area B
|bgcolor="40BFF5"|42.8
|bgcolor="40BFF5"|2
|17.1
|0
|21.5
|1
|0.0
|0
|18.6
|1
|4
|-
|align="left"|Area C
|36.9
|3
|bgcolor="#99FF66"|41.8
|bgcolor="#99FF66"|3
|21.3
|1
|0.0
|0
|0.0
|0
|7
|-
|align="left"|Area D
|bgcolor="40BFF5"|22.4
|bgcolor="40BFF5"|1
|18.4
|1
|10.9
|1
|20.9
|1
|27.4
|0
|4
|-
|- class="unsortable" class="sortbottom" style="background:#C9C9C9"
|align="left"| Total
|35.9
|8
|29.6
|6
|16.0
|3
|4.2
|1
|14.3
|2
|20
|-
|}

Districts results

Area A

1973: 2 x SDLP, 1 x UUP, 1 x Independent Nationalist, 1 x Independent Unionist
1977: 2 x SDLP, 2 x UUP, 1 x Independent Nationalist
1973-1977 Change: Independent Unionist joins UUP

Area B

1973: 1 x UUP, 1 x Alliance, 1 x Independent Nationalist, 1 x Independent Unionist
1977: 2 x UUP, 1 x Alliance, 1 x Independent Nationalist
1973-1977 Change: Independent Unionist joins UUP

Area C

1973: 3 x UUP, 2 x SDLP, 1 x Alliance, 1 x Nationalist
1977: 3 x UUP, 3 x SDLP, 1 x Alliance
1973-1977 Change: SDLP gain from Nationalist

Area D

1973: 1 x UUP, 1 x Alliance, 1 x Independent Nationalist, 1 x Independent Republican
1977: 1 x UUP, 1 x Alliance, 1 x SDLP, 1 x Republican Clubs
1973-1977 Change: SDLP gain from Independent Nationalist, Independent Republican joins Republican Clubs

References

Omagh District Council elections
Omagh